The 1930 East Renfrewshire by-election was a parliamentary by-election held on 28 November 1930 for the British House of Commons constituency of East Renfrewshire in Scotland.

Previous MP 
The seat had become vacant on when the constituency's Unionist Member of Parliament (MP), Alexander Munro MacRobert, had died on 18 October 1930, aged 57.  He had been East Renfrewshire's MP since winning the seat from Labour at the 1924 general election.

Candidates 

The Unionist candidate was The Marquess of Clydesdale, eldest son of the 13th Duke of Hamilton.

The Independent Labour Party candidate was Thomas Irwin, and Oliver Brown stood for the National Party of Scotland.

The Liberal Party did not field a candidate; it had last contested the seat in 1923, finishing a poor third.

Results 
On a slightly-reduced turnout, the result was a victory for The Marquess of Clydesdale, who won 54% of the votes.  He was re-elected at the next two general elections, remaining East Renfrewshire's MP until he succeeded to the Dukedom in 1940, triggering another by-election.

Votes

References

See also
 East Renfrewshire constituency
 East Renfrewshire
 1926 East Renfrewshire by-election
 1940 East Renfrewshire by-election
 List of United Kingdom by-elections (1918–1931)

1930 elections in the United Kingdom
1930 in Scotland
1930s elections in Scotland
By-elections to the Parliament of the United Kingdom in Scottish constituencies
History of East Renfrewshire
Politics of Renfrewshire
Politics of East Renfrewshire
November 1930 events